The duplicated gene nucleotide variant database (dbDNV) is a database of duplicated-gene nucleotide variants in the human genome

See also
 Gene duplication

References

External links
 http://goods.ibms.sinica.edu.tw/DNVs/

Biological databases
Molecular evolution
Mutation